Marian Pilot (born 6 December 1936) is a Polish writer, poet, journalist and screenwriter. He received the 2011 Nike Award, Poland's most important literary prize, for his novel Pióropusz (Plume).

Life and career

Born in 1936, in the village of Siedlików, Greater Poland, he attended the Marie Curie-Skłodowska High School No. 1 in Ostrzeszów. He subsequently graduated in journalism from the University of Warsaw. In 1954, he became a member of the communist Union of Polish Youth and since 1958 he worked in the culture section of the Polish Press Agency (PAP). He worked for such magazines as Wiadomości filmowe (1958–1960) and Na przełaj (1960–1967). In 1967, he joined the Polish Writers' Union and between 1967 and 1978 he served as head of culture section of Tygodnik Kulturalny weekly. Since 1981, he worked for the Polish state television Telewizja Polska.

In 1987, he received the Gold Cross of Merit. In 2009, he was granted the title of Honorary Citizen of the town of Ostrzeszów and he won the Władysław Reymont Literary Prize. In 2011, he was awarded the most prestigious prize in Polish literature, the Nike Award, for his novel Pióropusz (Plume). In 2022, he made his poetry debut by publishing Dzikie mięso (Wild Meat) which won 1st Prize at the Artur Fryz Literature Competition and for which he was nominated to the Angelus Award.

Publications
Dzikie mięso, Kraków 2021
Osobnik, Kraków 2013 
Nowy matecznik, Kraków 2012 
Zabawna zabawka albo Vin d'adieu, Warsaw 2012 
Ssapy, szkudły, świętojanki: słownik dawnej gwary Siedlikowa, Warsaw 2011, Ostrzeszów 2012
Pióropusz, Kraków 2010
Gody, Warsaw 2009 
Cierpki, oboki, nice: bardzo małe opo, Warsaw 2006
Na odchodnym: opowieści i opowiadania, Warsaw 2002
Bitnik Gorgolewski, Warsaw 1989
Matecznik, Warsaw 1988
W słońcu, w deszczu, Warsaw 1981
Ciżba: opowiadania i opowieści, Warsaw 1980
Wykidajło, Warsaw 1980 
Jednorożec, Warsaw 1978, 1981
Karzeł pierwszy, król tutejszy; Tam, gdzie much nie ma albo brzydactwa, Warsaw 1976 
Zakaz zwałki, Warsaw 1974 
Pantałyk, Warsaw 1970, Kraków 2012 
Majdan, Warsaw 1969 
Opowieści świętojańskie, Warsaw 1966
Sień, Warsaw 1965, 1989 
Panny szczerbate: opowiadania, Warsaw 1962, 1977.

Filmography
1997: Historia o proroku Eliaszu z Wierszalina – script
1987: Ucieczka z miejsc ukochanych – dialogues
1984: Pan na Żuławach – script
1979: W słońcu i w deszczu – script

See also
Polish literature
List of Polish writers

References

Living people
1936 births
Polish writers
Polish screenwriters
Polish translators
Nike Award winners
People from Greater Poland
University of Warsaw alumni
Recipient of the Meritorious Activist of Culture badge